

Sacha de Boer (born 9 April 1967) is a Dutch photographer, presenter and former journalist. From 1996 to 2013 she was a news presenter of the Dutch public news broadcaster NOS Journaal, acting as the news anchor of the eight o'clock news from 2003 onwards.

See also
 List of Dutch women photographers
 List of news presenters

References

External links
 
 

1967 births
Living people
People from Amsterdam
Dutch women photographers
21st-century Dutch photographers
21st-century women photographers
Dutch women television presenters
Dutch television news presenters
Dutch women journalists
Dutch television journalists
Dutch radio journalists
Dutch radio presenters
Dutch women radio presenters